The Gravatá River is a river of Minas Gerais state in southeastern Brazil.

See also
List of rivers of Minas Gerais

References
 Map from Ministry of Transport
 Rand McNally, The New International Atlas, 1993.

Rivers of Minas Gerais